Pitbull or pit bull is a term used in the United States for any bull-type terrier.

Pitbull or pit bull may also refer to:

People

Musicians
 Pitbull (rapper), Cuban-American entertainer (born Armando Christian Pérez)
 Sergio Reis Silva (born 1968), Brazilian musician, nicknamed "Sany Pitbull"

Sportspeople
 Andrei Arlovski, Belarusian mixed martial artist also known as "The Pitbull"
 Thiago Alves (fighter), Brazilian mixed martial artist also known as "Pitbull"
 Patrício Freire, Brazilian mixed martial artist also known as "Pitbull"
 Patricky Freire, Brazilian mixed martial artist also known as "Pitbull"
 Diego Rivas (fighter), Chilean mixed martial artist also known as "Pitbull"
 Damien "The Pitbull" Vachon, professional wrestler

 Regis Fernandes Silva (born 1976), Brazilian footballer, nicknamed "Regis Pitbull"
 Márcio José Lisboa Fortes Filho (born 1987), Brazilian footballer, nicknamed "Marcinho Pitbull"
 Cláudio Mejolaro (born 1982), Brazilian footballer, nicknamed "Cláudio Pitbull"
 Halef Silva Melo (born 1994), Brazilian footballer, nicknamed "Halef Pitbull"
 Tyrell Malacia (born 1999), Dutch footballer, nicknamed "The Pitbull"
 Gary Medel (born 1987), Chilean footballer, nicknamed "Pitbull" due to his aggressive, hard-tackling style of play

Groups and organizations
 Los Pitbulls, nickname of Alexis & Fido, a Latino Reggaetón duo
 Pitbull Studio, British videogame company
 Pitbull Syndicate, British videogame company

In sports
 The Pitbulls, professional wrestling tag team
 Pitbull #1, alias for pro wrestler Gary Wolfe 
 Pitbull #2, alias for pro wrestler Anthony Durante
 The Pitbulls, a former WWE professional wrestling tag team of Jamie Noble and Kid Kash
 Bristol Pitbulls, NIHL2 ice hockey team
 Florida Pit Bulls, ABA basketball team
 New York Pitbulls, International Fight League team
 Pennsylvania Pit Bulls, CBA basketball team
 Rotterdam Pitbulls, NRLB rugby league team
 Trelawny Pitbulls, speedway team

Transportation and vehicles
 North American Rotorwerks Pitbull II, an American autrogyro design
 North American Rotorwerks Pitbull SS, an American autrogyro design
 North American Rotorwerks Pitbull Ultralight (I), an American autrogyro design

In fiction
 Pitbull, GDI vehicle in Command & Conquer video game series

Entertainment and arts
 The Pitbulls (album), 2005 eponymous reggaeton album by Los Pitbulls
 Pitbull (film), 2005 Polish film
 Pit Bull (TV series), a debate show about NASCAR
 Pit Bull: The Battle over an American Icon, a history book about dogs

See also

 Pitbull T, UK musician, member of Roll Deep
 Biggie Pitbull, UK musician, member of Roll Deep
 The American Pitbulls, pro-wrestling tag team
 The Havana Pitbulls, pro-wrestling tag team
 The UK Pitbulls, pro-wrestling tag team
 Pitbull/Public Enemy Memorial Cup, PWU pro-wrestling tournament
 
 
 
 
 
 Bull (disambiguation)
 Pit (disambiguation)